Valley Waters is a village in the Canadian province of New Brunswick. It was formed through the 2023 New Brunswick local governance reforms.

History 
Valley Waters was incorporated on January 1, 2023.  Located in Kings County, it consists of the village of Norton and all or part of five local service districts to form the new village of Valley Waters. The community's name remains in official use. Revised census figures have not been released.

See also 
List of communities in New Brunswick
List of municipalities in New Brunswick

References 

2023 establishments in New Brunswick
2023 New Brunswick local governance reform
Populated places established in 2023
Villages in New Brunswick